Daddy, Darling is a 1970 Danish / American sexploitation film directed by Joseph W. Sarno.

Plot
Nineteen year old Katja (Helli Louise) lives with her father Eric (Ole Wisborg). She has fallen in love with her father, and she is shocked when he announces that he wants to marry his girlfriend Svea (Gio Petré). After a brief affair with Lars, she is introduced to a circle of lesbian women.

Cast 
 Helli Louise - Katja
 Gio Petré - Svea Karlson
  - Eric Holmquist
 Lise Henningsen - Lena Belli
  - Lars
 Lise Thomsen - Eva
 Tove Maës - Segrid Sten

References

External links 

1970 films
Films directed by Joseph W. Sarno
American sexploitation films
1970 LGBT-related films
Danish erotic films
1970s English-language films
1970s American films